Fart lighting also known as pyroflatulence, or flatus ignition is the practice of igniting the gases produced by flatulence. The resulting flame is often of a blue hue hence the act being known colloquially as a "blue angel", "blue dart" or in Australia, a "blue flame". The fact that flatus is flammable and the actual combustion of it through this practice gives rise to much humorous derivation. Other colors of flame such as orange and yellow are possible depending on the mixture of gases formed in the colon.

In 1999, author Jim Dawson observed that fart lighting has been a novelty practice primarily among young men or college students for decades but is discouraged for its potential for causing harm. Such experiments typically occur on camping trips and in same-sex group residences, such as tree-houses, dormitories, or fraternity houses. With the advent of video sharing features online, hundreds of self-produced videos, both documentary as well as spoof, have been posted to sites such as YouTube. The people appearing in the videos are predominantly young teen males. In his book The Curse of the Self: Self-Awareness, Egotism, and the Quality of Human Life, author Mark Richard Leary explains how a great deal of unhappiness is due to people's inability to exert control over their thoughts and behavior and that "stupid stunts", including lighting flatulence, were a way to make an impression and be included in group bonding or hazing.
 
Although there is little scientific discourse on the combustive properties of flatus, there are many anecdotal accounts of flatus ignition and the activity has increasingly found its way into popular culture with references in comic routines, movies, and television; including cartoons. In his book Electric Don Quixote: The Definitive Story of Frank Zappa, author Neil Slaven quotes Zappa for calling fart lighting "the manly art of fart-burning", and another book quotes the musician Kenny Williams for saying that it demonstrates "compression, ignition, combustion and exhaust."

There have been documented cases of flatulence during surgery being inadvertently ignited causing patient injury and the risk of death.

Chemistry
The composition of flatus varies dramatically among individuals. Flatulence produces a mixture of gases including methane, which burns in oxygen forming water and carbon dioxide often producing a blue hue (ΔHc = −891 kJ/mol), as:

(g) + 2 (g) → (g) + 2 (g)

Hydrogen sulfide is also flammable (ΔHc = −519 kJ/mol), and burns to

2 (g) + 3 (g) → 2 (g) + 2 (g)

Gas production
Some of the gases that cause flatulence, such as methane and hydrogen, are produced by bacteria which live in symbiosis within the large intestines of humans and other mammals. The gases are created as a by-product of the bacteria's digestion of food into relatively simpler substances. The oxygen and nitrogen component of flatus can be accounted for by aerophagy while the CO2 component results from the reaction of stomach acids (HCl) with alkaline pancreatic bile (NaHCO3).

The odor associated with flatus is due to hydrogen sulfide, skatole, indole, volatile amines, and short-chain fatty acids also produced by the bacteria. These substances are detectable by olfactory neurons in concentrations as low as 10 parts per billion, hydrogen sulfide being the most detectable.

See also

 Human gastrointestinal microbiota
 Natural gas

References

External links
 Videos of Fart Lighting on YouTube

Flatulence in popular culture
Humour
Fire in culture